Joe Dancer is an American private detective television series starring, created, produced and narrated by Robert Blake. NBC released three television films that aired from 1981 to 1983.

References

External links

Thrillingdetective.com

1980s American crime drama television series
American detective television series
1980s American mystery television series
American television films
NBC original programming
1981 American television series debuts
1983 American television series endings
English-language television shows
Television series by MGM Television